Ficus heterophylla is a fig plant species, in the family Moraceae, which can be found in India, southern China, Indo-China and western Malesia.  In Vietnam it may be called vú bò.

Synonyms 
No subspecies are listed in the Catalogue of Life.  Various previously described varieties have either been subsumed or re-assigned to other species:
 F. heterophylla var. assamica (Miq.) Corner ex Chater is a synonym of Ficus repens Roxb. ex Sm.
 F. heterophylla var. mindanaensis (Warb.) Corner (and F. mindanaensis Warb.) are synonyms of Ficus grewiifolia Blume.

Gallery

References

External links 
 
 

heterophylla
Flora of Indo-China
Flora of Malesia